This article is about the third Washington Diplomats of the APSL. For the original and second Washington Diplomats of the NASL , see Washington Diplomats

The Washington Diplomats were an American soccer team established in 1987 which played in the American Soccer League in 1988 and 1989 and the American Professional Soccer League in 1990.

History
Established in 1987 as an independent team, the Diplomats, owned by Julio Pinon, drew many of their players, and head coach Hugo Berly, from Club España.  The newly formed Diplomats won the inaugural and only Ambassador Cup when they tied the Honduras national football team in June.  In April 1988, the team entered the newly established American Soccer League.  At the time, Ian Bain had been hired as an interim head coach.  On May 6, 1988, Berly returned as head coach with the team at 2-3.  He quickly revamped the Diplomats roster, bringing in Philip Gyau and Jean Harbor who were instrumental in taking the team to the ASL title that season.  The Diplomats began the 1989 American Soccer League season well, but lost team-leading scorer Harbor for a month to suspension after he broke Pedro Magallanes jaw.  The Dips finished just out of playoff contention.  For the 1990 season, the league merged with the Western Soccer Alliance to form the American Professional Soccer League.  The Diplomats finished the 1990 season with the lowest number of points in the APSL Eastern Conference.  In October 1990, the league terminated the Diplomats because the team was facing significant financial difficulties at the time.

Year-by-year

Honors
ASL Champions (1): 1989
Participations in CONCACAF Champions' Cup: 1988

Coaches
Hugo Berly (1987)
Ian Bain (1988 - interim)
Hugo Berly (1988)
John Ellinger (1989)
Stojan Nikolic (1990)

References

External links
 1988 roster and results

Defunct soccer clubs in Washington, D.C.
American Soccer League (1988–89) teams
American Professional Soccer League teams
1987 establishments in Washington, D.C.
1990 disestablishments in Washington, D.C.
Association football clubs established in 1987
Association football clubs disestablished in 1990
U.S. clubs in CONCACAF Champions' Cup